Below is a partial list of concrete poets and visual poets with article written, where appropriate, from around the world.

Belgium
 Guy Bleus

Brazil
 Eduardo Kac
 Augusto de Campos
 Haroldo de Campos
 Décio Pignatari
 Philadelpho Menezes

Australia
 Jas H. Duke
 Peter Murphy
 Pi O
 Amanda Stewart
 Richard Tipping

Austria
 Friedrich Achleitner
 H. C. Artmann
 Ernst Jandl

Canada
 Jim Andrews
 Gary Barwin
 Shaunt Basmajian
 Derek Beaulieu
 Earle Birney
 Bill Bissett
 Christian Bök
 Barbara Caruso
 Judith Copithorne
 Paul Dutton
 Helen Hajnoczky
 Paul Hartal
 Lionel Kearns
 Nobuo Kubota
 Camille Martin
 Steve McCaffery
 bpNichol
 Joe O'Sullivan
 Angela Rawlings
 Steven Ross Smith
 Andrew Suknaski
 George Swede
 David UU (David W. Harris)
 Darren Wershler-Henry

Czechoslovakia
 Bohumila Grögerová
 Václav Havel
 Josef Hiršal
 Radoslav Rochallyi
 Jiri Kolar
 Eduard Ovčáček

France
 Pierre Albert-Birot
 Isidore Isou

Germany
 Max Bense
 Reinhard Döhl
 Helmut Heißenbüttel
 Dieter Roth

Holland
 Rod Summers

Israel
David Avidan

Italy
Francesco Aprile
Mirella Bentivoglio
Nanni Balestrini
Luciano Caruso
Giovanni Fontana
Ketty La Rocca
Leoncillo
Eugenio Miccini
Maurizio Nannucci
Lamberto Pignotti
Giovanna Sandri 
Patrizia Vicinelli

Japan
 Seiichi Niikuni
 Katué Kitasono

Poland
 Stanisław Dróżdż

Russia
 Ry Nikonova
 Sergej Sigej
 Dmitri Prigov
 Andrei Monastyrski

Scotland
 Ian Hamilton Finlay
 Edwin Morgan

South Africa 
 Willem Boshoff
 Kendell Geers

Spain 
 Joan Brossa
 Chema Madoz
 Bartomeu / Bartolomé Ferrando
 etc.

Switzerland 
 Eugen Gomringer

United Kingdom
 Paula Claire
 Bob Cobbing
 Ian Hamilton Finlay
 Alan Halsey
 Dom Sylvester Houédard
 Geraldine Monk
 Tom Phillips
 Stephen Bann

United States
 William James Austin
 John M. Bennett
 John Cage
 E. E. Cummings
 David Daniels
 Johanna Drucker
 Endwar
 K.S. Ernst
 Chris Franke
 Ken Friedman
 Jesse Glass
 Robert Grenier
 Dick Higgins
 Davi Det Hompson
 Ray Johnson
 Ronald Johnson
 Bill Keith
 Alison Knowles
 Richard Kostelanetz
 Robert Lax
 D. A. Levy
 Camille Martin
 Sheila Murphy
 Bruce Nauman
 F. A. Nettelbeck
 Monica Ong
 Kenneth Patchen
 Bern Porter
 Ad Reinhardt
 Marilyn R. Rosenberg
 SAMO© Graffiti
 Aram Saroyan
 Armand Schwerner
 Mary Ellen Solt
 Cecil Touchon
 Regina Vater
 Hannah Weiner
 Emmett Williams
 Jonathan Williams
 Michael Winkler
 Z'EV

Lists of poets